Axel Gordon Hultquist (1904 – 1 November 1941) was a New Zealand politician of the Labour Party.

Early life

Hultquist was born in Bunbury, Western Australia, an electrician and the son of a Swedish Salvation Army Officer. He emigrated to New Zealand 1907 with his parents. He received education in Hamilton and later Auckland before becoming an apprentice electrician in Christchurch. There he was involved in union work and was an organiser for Dan Sullivan MP for Avon. He moved back to Auckland in 1925 where he became a foreman with Allum Electrical Company. He was a member of the executive of the Auckland Electrical Workers Union and Grey Lynn Debating Society.

Political career

Hultquist was on John A. Lee's campaign committee in Grey Lynn in 1931. In 1933 he stood unsuccessfully for the Auckland City Council on a Labour Party ticket.

He represented the Bay of Plenty electorate from the 1935 general election to 1941 when he died.

World War II
A territorial soldier, he volunteered on the outbreak of war in 1939. He enlisted in the New Zealand Army, and took part in the campaigns in Greece and Crete. He was a Lieutenant in the Signals Corps when he died in Egypt from influenza.

References

External links

Photo of Lieutenant Hultquist
Biography at Union website

1904 births
1941 deaths
New Zealand Labour Party MPs
New Zealand military personnel killed in World War II
Australian emigrants to New Zealand
New Zealand Army officers
New Zealand Salvationists
Members of the New Zealand House of Representatives
New Zealand MPs for North Island electorates
People from Bunbury, Western Australia
New Zealand people of Swedish descent
20th-century New Zealand politicians
20th-century Methodists